Logan Huffman (born December 22, 1989) is an American actor.  He appeared in the 2009 TV series V and starred in the 2013 film Bad Turn Worse.

Personal life 
Huffman was born in Noblesville, Indiana, where he was the first born of triplets, and has an older brother. He grew up in Indianapolis. He moved to New York City when he was 17 to pursue his dreams in acting.  He is a believer in the paranormal and is dyslexic.

He became engaged to Lisa Origliasso of The Veronicas in late 2016, and married in November 2018.

Career 
In 2009, he joined the cast of V. His character, Tyler Evans, was not popular with fans of the series.  In 2012, he appeared in Refuge, and, in 2013, he starred in Bad Turn Worse. In 2015, Huffman appeared in two films directed by Tyler Shields, Outlaw and Final Girl.  He also appeared in the 2015 film The Preppie Connection.

Filmography

Film

Television

Music Videos

References

External links 
 

Living people
1989 births
21st-century American male actors
Male actors from Indianapolis
Actors with dyslexia